Canim Beach Provincial Park is a provincial park in British Columbia, Canada, located at the southwest end of Canim Lake in the Interlakes District of the South Cariboo region, adjacent to the Secwepemc Indian reserve community of Canim Lake, British Columbia just northeast of 100 Mile House.

"Canim" means a type of large canoe in the Chinook Jargon.

See also
Canim Falls
Canim Lake Band
Canim River

References

Provincial parks of British Columbia
Geography of the Cariboo
Landforms of the Cariboo
Beaches of British Columbia
Chinook Jargon place names
Protected areas established in 1956
1956 establishments in British Columbia